The Campaccio is an annual cross country running competition which takes place in early January in San Giorgio su Legnano, Italy. Organised by the Unione Sportiva Sangiorgese (Sangiorgese Sports Association), the event attracts participation from Olympic and world champions in athletics, in spite of the fact that the host town has a population of just over 6000. It is typically the first major athletics event of the year in Italy, and holds IAAF Cross Country Permit status.

History 

The event was first held in 1957 in a rough patch of farmland in the town and derives its name from the word "Campasc", which means "uncultivated field" in the local dialect. The Campaccio began as a men's only race, but expanded to include a men's junior race in 1961. The first women's race was held in 1970, with Paola Cacchitaking the inaugural honours, but it was not until 1975 that the women's contest became an annual fixture. The men's race was held over 12 kilometres for much of its history, but this was changed to a 10 km race in 2008. The women's race was initially around 3.5 km but settled on a 6 km format in the mid-1990s.

The competition has particular importance to Italian cross country runners as performances at the race, as well as the Italian national championships, often determine the national selection for the IAAF World Cross Country Championships. The organisers successfully bid to hold the 2006 European Cross Country Championships in San Giorgio su Legnano, which coincided with the 50th edition of the Campaccio cross country race. In celebration of the anniversary, prominent Italian athletics journalist Ennio Buongiovanni published a book documenting the event's history: Campaccio e Dintorni - 50 Anni Di Storia (Campaccio and its Setting – 50 Years of History). As a result of the continental championships (scheduled in mid-December), independent Campaccio races were not held in either 2006 or 2007.

The men's race often features the top Kenyan and Italian runners, while the women's elite race attracts a greater variety of nationalities, particularly Europeans. Past winners on the men's side include world champions Paul Tergat, Kenenisa Bekele, Haile Gebrselassie and Eliud Kipchoge. The women's race has been won by world champions Jackline Maranga, Ingrid Kristiansen and Grete Waitz, as well as prominent marathoners Uta Pippig and Paula Radcliffe. Some of Italy's best runners have taken victory at the Campaccio, such as steeplechase world champion Francesco Panetta, Olympic marathon winner Gelindo Bordin, Gabriella Dorio (1984 Olympic champion) and Olympic medallist Paola Pigni-Cacchi.

Past senior race winners

Key:

Winners by country

See also
Cross della Vallagarina
Cinque Mulini
Trofeo Alasport

References

List of winners
Civai, Franco & Lorange, Francois (2011-01-10). Campaccio Classica del Cross. Association of Road Racing Statisticians. Retrieved on 2011-01-12.

Further reading
Buongiovanni, Ennio (2006). Campaccio e Dintorni - 50 Anni Di Storia.

External links

Unione Sportiva Sangiorgese – official website

Cross country running competitions
Athletics competitions in Italy
Recurring sporting events established in 1957
Sport in Lombardy
Cross country running in Italy
Annual sporting events in Italy
1957 establishments in Italy
Winter events in Italy
San Giorgio su Legnano